The Journal of the American Psychoanalytic Association  is a bi-monthly peer-reviewed healthcare journal covering all aspects of psychoanalysis and is the official journal of the American Psychoanalytic Association. The editor in chief is Mitchell Wilson.

Abstracting and indexing 
Journal of the American Psychoanalytic Association is abstracted and indexed in, among other databases:  SCOPUS, and the Social Sciences Citation Index. According to the Journal Citation Reports, the journal has a 2017 impact factor of 0.538, ranking it 4th out of 12 journals in the category "Psychology, Psychoanalysis", and 130th out of 142 journals in the category "Psychiatry (SSCI)".

See also 
 List of psychotherapy journals

References

External links
 
 American Psychoanalytic Association

Bimonthly journals
English-language journals
Psychoanalysis journals
Psychotherapy journals
Publications established in 1953
Psychoanalysis in the United States